Mate Dragičević (born 19 November 1979) is a Croatian retired football striker.

Club career
He has enjoyed successful stints at several clubs, with Croatian giants Hajduk Split and Dinamo Zagreb the standouts and has won two Prva HNL Croatian First League championships. His season at Dinamo was stunted due to injury, however he made nineteen appearances for Hajduk Split between 2004-2006 scoring six goals, last season at Hajduk Split he was injured. He has won First Russian Division championship with FC Khimki.

At Perth Glory he had an unsuccessful season. Dragicevic scored one goal in the pre-season cup competition away to Central Coast Mariners, but was unable to find the back of the net during the regular season.

On 20 January, the closing day of the Iranian winter transfer season, Dragičević signed a 6-month contract with Persepolis in the Iran Pro League. He scored his first goal for Persepolis against Abu Moslem Mashhad after 88 minutes on 10 Feb. In his third match for Persepolis, he scored against Peykan after 18 minutes on 15 February.

At the start of the 2009/2010 season he joined HŠK Zrinjski Mostar, but got injured in his first game. He returned to action on 8 November against Leotar, as second-half substitute, and scored a goal in 3-0 Zrinjski victory.

Honours

Winner: 1

2002/03 with Dinamo Zagreb (First Croatian league)
2004/05 with Hajduk Split (First Croatian league)
2005/06 with Khimki Moscow (First Russian Division)
2007/08 with Persepolis (Iran Pro league)

References

External links
 The West news article

1979 births
Living people
Sportspeople from Makarska
Association football forwards
Croatian footballers
Croatia under-21 international footballers
NK Zagreb players
NK Lučko players
NK Inter Zaprešić players
NK Croatia Sesvete players
HNK Rijeka players
HNK Šibenik players
GNK Dinamo Zagreb players
HNK Hajduk Split players
FC Khimki players
NK Istra 1961 players
Perth Glory FC players
Persepolis F.C. players
FC DAC 1904 Dunajská Streda players
HŠK Zrinjski Mostar players
KF Laçi players
NK Vinogradar players
Croatian Football League players
Russian First League players
A-League Men players
Persian Gulf Pro League players
Slovak Super Liga players
Premier League of Bosnia and Herzegovina players
Kategoria Superiore players
First Football League (Croatia) players
Croatian expatriate footballers
Expatriate footballers in Russia
Croatian expatriate sportspeople in Russia
Expatriate soccer players in Australia
Croatian expatriate sportspeople in Australia
Expatriate footballers in Iran
Croatian expatriate sportspeople in Iran
Expatriate footballers in Slovakia
Croatian expatriate sportspeople in Slovakia
Expatriate footballers in Bosnia and Herzegovina
Croatian expatriate sportspeople in Bosnia and Herzegovina
Expatriate footballers in Albania
Croatian expatriate sportspeople in Albania